Mahmoud Nili Ahmadabadi (born 1956) is a professor of metallurgy at the University of Tehran, who served as the President of University of Tehran from 2014 to 2021. He is also former head of the Center for Excellence for Higher Performance Material at the University of Tehran.In October 2021, the then president of the University of Tehran, Mahmoud Nili Ahmadabadi, wrote a letter to Gholam-Hossein Mohseni-Eje'i, the head of the Islamic Republic's judiciary, demanding the release of Kasra Nouri, a student prisoner, and a day later the president of the University of Tehran himself was fired.

Education and career
Mahmoud Nili Ahmadabadi, who is generally called Mahmoud Nili, was born in 1956 in Isfahan, Iran. After obtaining a BSc degree from University of Shiraz in 1982, he started working for revolutionary institutes. Seven years later, he got a MSc degree from Sharif University of Technology and went to Japan to further his studies in Tohoku University. Mahmoud Nili has written more than 70 scholarly articles.

See also 
 University of Tehran
 Kasra Nouri

References

Scientists from Isfahan
Academic staff of the University of Tehran
1956 births
Living people
Iranian academic administrators
21st-century Iranian educators